William Warder Norton (September 17, 1891 – November 7, 1945) was a publisher and co-founder of W. W. Norton & Company. He grew up in Columbus, Ohio, moved to New York City and started an import-export business, met and married Margaret Dows Herter, known as Polly or Mary. In 1923, they began publishing lectures delivered at the People's Institute, the adult education division of New York City's Cooper Union. William and Margaret had a daughter, Anne Aston Warder Norton (1928-1977). The Nortons soon expanded their program beyond the Institute, acquiring manuscripts by celebrated academics from America and abroad. This is the beginning of W. W. Norton & Company. Starting in 1942 he was very active with the Council on Books in Wartime. It was that council, which was a consortium of publishers, that agreed to an equitable distribution of paper and binding materials, all these scarce materials that went into the manufacture of books. He died at 54, just four months after V-E Day.

References

1891 births
1945 deaths
American book publishers (people)
20th-century American businesspeople